The current status of polygamy is difficult to determine in Botswana as, legally, only marriage between a single man and woman is permissible, though there is a notable loophole. A man can marry his first wife (or village wife) under customary law, while then marrying his second under civil law. While the practice was thought to have long disappeared from the region, it has been noted that polygamous unions are still active in Botswana, though not particularly common. It has also been reported that a high number of problems have resulted from polygamous unions in the nation, such as divorce battles, sexual abuse and a higher spread of HIV/AIDS, which is a notable problem to begin with in the country.

References 

Society of Botswana
Botswana
Women's rights in Botswana